Solo-Duo is a compilation album released after Kenny Drew's death in 1996 consisting of dates recorded in the years of 1966, 1977 and 1983. The album features solo work as well as duo work, performed on separate dates with double-bassists Bo Stief and Niels-Henning Ørsted Pedersen.

Track listing 
Ev'rything I Love (6:51)
Ode to Mariann (3:04)
Willow Weep for Me (3:36)
Swingin' Till the Girls Come Home (6:41)
Yesterdays (5:33)
Blues for Nils (4:17)
Simple Need (2:59)
Whisper Not (3:58)
Blues for Nils (10:08)
There's No Greater Love (7:49)
Ack Värmeland du Sköna (8:09)
Bluesology (6:21)

Personnel
Kenny Drew - piano
Bo Stief - double-bass
Niels-Henning Ørsted Pedersen - double bass

References

Kenny Drew albums
Hard bop albums
1996 compilation albums